Hagerup is a surname. Notable people with the surname include:

Caspar Peter Hagerup (1777–1840), Norwegian civil servant
Edvard Hagerup (1781–1853), Norwegian solicitor and politician
Edvard Hagerup Bull (1855–1938), Norwegian judge and politician for the Conservative Party
Edvard Hagerup Bull (composer) (1922–2012), Norwegian composer
Edvard Hagerup Grieg (1843–1907), Norwegian composer and pianist
Eiler Eilersen Hagerup (1718–1789), the Bishop of Bjørgvin and Christianssand in Norway
Eiler Hansen Hagerup (1685–1743), the Bishop of Nidaros in Norway
Eiler Hagerup Krog Prytz, Jr. (1883–1963), Norwegian goldsmith
Eiler Hagerup Krog Prytz, Sr. (1812–1900), Norwegian bailiff and politician
Francis Hagerup (1853–1921), Norwegian lawyer, diplomat and politician for the Conservative Party
Hans Hagerup Falbe (1772–1830), the Norwegian Minister of Auditing, Minister of the Navy and Minister of Justice
Hans Hagerup Krag (1829–1907), Norwegian engineer
Henrik Steffens Hagerup (1806–1859), Norwegian naval officer and politician who served as Minister of the Navy
Inger Hagerup (1905–1985), Norwegian author, playwright and poet
Klaus Hagerup (born 1946), Norwegian author, translator, screenwriter, actor and director
Mathias Hagerup (1765–1822), Norwegian director general in Stockholm and acting state secretary to the Council of State Division in Stockholm
Olaf Hagerup (1889–1961), Danish botanist
Sverre Hagerup Bull (1892–1976), Norwegian banker, composer and writer

See also
Hagerup's Second Cabinet